The A8 motorway is a  toll motorway in Croatia. It connects the A7 motorway near Rijeka with the road network in the Istrian peninsula via the Učka Tunnel. The road terminates at the Kanfanar interchange with the A9 motorway, which with the A8 motorway forms the Istrian Y road system. The motorway's national significance is reflected in its positive economic impact on the cities and towns it connects, as well as its importance to tourism in Croatia. The importance of the motorway for tourism is particularly high during the summer tourist season, when its traffic volume increases by about 65%.

The construction of the A8 motorway and the Istrian Y can be traced back to 1968 when the Croatian Parliament decided to build a modern road linking Istria with the rest of Croatia. Subsequently, a bond to fund the construction was issued. The construction work started in 1976; in 1981 the Učka Tunnel was finished and a  section of the route between Matulji and Lupoglav was completed as a single-carriageway, two-lane expressway. The Lupoglav-Cerovlje portion was the next one to be completed, in 1988. The route was extended to the Rogovići interchange between 1992 and 1998, and the remaining section to Kanfanar was completed in 1999 as a two-lane road. In 2011, the expressway route started to be expanded gradually with the addition of a new carriageway and emergency lanes, eventually making most of it a controlled-access highway; the expansion of the route's first section, between Kanfanar and Rogovići, was completed in October 2011. The route's full expansion to motorway standards – including six lanes and grade separation of all its interchanges – is scheduled by 2015, when a second tube for the Učka Tunnel and a new route connecting the tunnel to the A7 motorway are planned. Construction slowed in the 1990s due to a lack of funding; therefore, a build-operate-transfer concession for the Istrian Y was granted to the BINA Istra corporation for a period of 32 years.

All intersections found along the route are grade separated, except for a single at-grade intersection currently regulated by traffic lights; a new route is planned to bypass this intersection. As of June 2021, there were eleven exits and two service areas along the route. The motorway is currently toll-free except for the Učka Tunnel and the Kanfanar-Rogovići section. However, most of the motorway is potentially a toll road using a ticket system, with each exit including a toll plaza except those of Veprinac, Opatija, and Matulji. The toll system of the A8/A9 Istrian Y is integrated: A8 tickets are valid interchangeably on the A9 sections and vice versa, thus obviating the need to stop between the sections.

Route description

The A8 motorway is an east–west motorway in Croatia, crossing the eastern and central parts of Istria. It connects the Matulji interchange near Rijeka, the largest city on the northern Adriatic coast of Croatia, to Istria via the Kanfanar interchange situated in the area of the city of Rovinj. The motorway represents a link between the A7 and the A9 motorway—spanning between border of Slovenia and the cities of Rijeka and Pula, respectively. This part of the road network of Croatia is also part of European route E751, consisting of the Koper–Kanfanar–Pula and Kanfanar–Rijeka sections. The route is economically important to Croatia, especially for tourism and as a cargo transport route. The road carries significant cargo and tourist traffic as the largest-capacity road link between the Istrian and Kvarner Gulf regions and the nation's capital, Zagreb. The final segment of the route – between the Učka tunnel and the Matulji interchange – has a design speed of  because of the mountainous terrain crossed and proximity of residential structures.

The route originates in the Kanfanar interchange with the A9 motorway and the D303 road in central Istria, east of Rovinj. From that point, the A8 proceeds east towards the Žminj exit; there it turns north towards the Rogovići interchange with the D48 road. The latter represents the western approach to Pazin, the capital of Istria County. The A8 section between Kanfanar and Rogovići consists of four traffic lanes with a central reservation. Beyond the Rogovići interchange, the A8 changes direction once again, running generally to the northeast; it acts as a bypass around Pazin. The road then heads toward Cerovlje, running along and near the Pazinčica river valley and the Cerovlje valley; this includes a  bridge over the Pazinčica river. Past Lupoglav, after going over the Lupoglav–Raša railway line the A8 heads southeast, until it reaches the D500 road at the Vranja exit and the western entrance to the  Učka Tunnel; this is the third-longest road tunnel in Croatia. The tunnel carries the route east, through part of the Učka mountain range. It represents the end of the easternmost section of the Istrian Y system (comprising the A8 and the A9 motorways) where a toll is charged; consequently, there are toll plazas adjacent to both tunnel entrances. East of the tunnel, the route runs northeast to the Matulji interchange with the A7 motorway and the eastern terminus of the A8 motorway. This section contains the Opatija and Veprinac exits, serving Opatija, Ičići, Lovran and other Opatija Riviera resorts. An additional climbing lane is present along parts of this segment. Unlike all the other exits found along the route, the Opatija exit is an at-grade intersection regulated by a traffic light, while the Veprinac exit is executed as a partial cloverleaf interchange. A significant portion of the route has no emergency lanes as yet, but lay-bys are available intermittently along the route.

The bulk of the route runs through forested areas, especially near the Učka range and near Pazin, with agricultural land in between those areas – most of it located between the Ivoli and Lupoglav interchanges. The final section of the route, near Opatija and the A7 motorway, runs through coastal areas affected by urbanization. The route crosses no major watercourses, although creeks adjacent to or spanned by the route drain into the Pazinčica and Boljunčica rivers, or directly into the Adriatic Sea in the case of watercourses flowing down Učka's eastern slopes. The Učka Tunnel contains a spring discovered during its construction and used for the water supply of Opatija ever since.

The route runs through an area subject to significant air temperature variations. The weather patterns prevailing along the route include: an average of three to four days of snow cover, especially in the central parts of Istria; high winds and gales east of the Učka Tunnel, recorded during, respectively, 15 and 54 days per year on average; and fog in the areas west of the Učka mountains and around Pazin, respectively occurring 80 and 50 days per year on average.

An automatic traffic monitoring and guidance system is installed along the motorway. It consists of measuring (of both traffic and weather), control (e.g., variable speed limits), and signalling devices located in zones where driving conditions may vary, such as at the interchanges, viaducts, bridges, and zones where fog or strong wind are known to occur. The system uses variable-message signs to communicate changing driving conditions, possible restrictions, and other information to motorway users.

Tolls

The A8 is a toll road based on the Croatian vehicle classification using a ticket system—charging for use of the motorway based on distance travelled. The system was introduced as a unified toll charge system throughout the Istrian Y motorways in June 2011. Consequently, vehicles using either the A8 or the A9 or switching between the two at the Kanfanar interchange are charged a toll only when they leave the Istrian Y system, no matter where their toll ticket was issued. Along the A8 motorway, a toll is charged only for using the Učka Tunnel and the Kanfanar–Rogovići section; the remaining sections of the motorway are toll-free as of June 2012. Despite this, toll tickets are issued and collected at all exits with toll plazas. For instance, vehicles traveling between Rogovići and Vranja interchanges are issued toll tickets and are required to stop at toll plazas when entering and leaving the A8, but they are not charged for using the route. However, after new sections of the full profile of the highway from Rogovići to Lupoglav and further in direction of new junction Vranja were opened, the toll started to charge also for mentioned sections. The toll charge for travelling the entire length of the motorway ranges from 36.00 kuna for passenger cars to 205.00 kuna (€27.33) for semi-trailer trucks, in 2011 year. In October 2022, the toll charge for the entire A8 motorway ranged from 37.00 kuna (€4.90) for motorcycles, then 62.00 kuna (€8.20) for passenger cars, up to 315.00 kuna (€41.80) for semi-trailer trucks. The toll can be paid in either Croatian kuna or euros using major credit cards, debit cards and several prepaid toll collection systems, including various types of smart cards issued by the motorway operator and ENC; the last is an electronic toll collection system that is shared between all motorways in Croatia except the A2, providing drivers with discounted toll rates and dedicated lanes at toll plazas.

In 2010, BINA Istra (the operator of the motorway) collected €38 million in revenues while its expenditure reached €230 million. In the first half of 2011, however, BINA Istra reported 65.8 million kuna (€8.9 million) of income in the first half of 2011, without VAT. This income represented a 30.8 percent increase compared to the same period in the previous year. (The figure includes income from the entire Istrian Y system, i.e., both the A8 and A9 motorways.) Most of this increase is attributed to the introduction of a closed toll system along the routes, replacing an open toll system in which a toll was charged only at the Mirna Bridge (along the A9 motorway) and the Učka Tunnel. In 1999, the Croatian government negotiated amendments to the BINA Istra concession contract. These amendments allow the government to determine tolls along the A8 and A9 motorways, and the government decided to eliminate tolls on traffic flowing along the two-lane sections of the routes; to compensate for this loss of income, the government subsidizes BINA Istra – for instance, in 2012 it is expected to receive a 165 million kuna ( million) subsidy. By the end of 2010, the subsidy paid to BINA Istra reached a total of 1.3 billion kuna ( million); at the time, it was estimated that a further sum of 1.9 billion kuna ( million) may be paid in annual subsidies between 2011 and 2027, when the concession contract expires. BINA Istra estimates the total investment value of the construction it has carried out or planned on the A8 and A9 routes at one billion euros.

History

The construction of the A8 motorway (and the Istrian Y as a whole) has its origin in 1968, when the Croatian Parliament endorsed a petition by Istrian legislators for the construction of a modern road between the peninsula and the rest of Croatia. Subsequently, Istrian municipalities started a public bond to fund the construction of the Učka Tunnel. This construction happened between 1976 and 1981, including the construction of a  route section between Matulji and Lupoglav.

The Y shape formed by the A8 and the A9 routes was originally defined by highway planning documents decided upon in Rijeka and Istria, subsequently incorporated in highway planning documents of the Republic of Croatia in 1988. Lupoglav–Cerovlje was the next section to be completed, in 1988. The A8 route was extended to the Rogovići interchange between 1992 and 1998 and the remaining section to Kanfanar was completed in 1999.

As the construction was comparatively slow due to a lack of funding, a motorway concession for the A8 and A9 motorways was granted to BINA Istra for a period of 32 years. The build-operate-transfer concession agreement mandated construction, maintenance and management of the route and its upgrade to motorway standards; this requirement included the building of dual carriageways when the annual average daily traffic (AADT) reached 10,000 vehicles per day or when the average summer daily traffic (ASDT) reached 16,000 vehicles per day. The latter was achieved in 2005 and the motorway upgrade started in 2008, even though the AADT at the time was only 8,500 vehicles. The A8 expansion was commenced by the operator, BINA Istra, immediately following a similar expansion of the A9; on the latter, the entire route was widened except for the two largest bridges, for which the expansion was postponed. The expansion of the A8 was initially limited to the Kanfanar–Rogovići section because the remainder of the route required additional permits and consequently an extended preparation period. On 29 October 2011, the Kanfanar–Rogovići section was upgraded to motorway standards, including four traffic lanes, and the route's designation changed from B8 to A8 (as required by legislated standards). The construction performed along the section entailed deep and long cuts requiring temporary traffic stoppages due to explosive blasting.

The construction of the full profile of the highway from Rogović to the Učka Tunnel started on 15 November 2018, in the length of 28 kilometers, the investment is worth 1.2 billion kuna without VAT. It was very challenging in terms of construction because it requires a large number of overpasses, underpasses and viaducts, as well as the construction of the Rebri rest area, which is necessary for safety reasons, since there is no rest area from the Učka Tunnel to Vodnjan. A total of thirty-one buildings with a length of 2,510 meters were built, twelve viaducts, sixteen underpasses and three overpasses instead of the existing three that will be demolished. In addition, several retaining walls and auxiliary facilities were built, and corrections were made to the route of the existing road at three locations. Due to the complexity of the project, it was divided into three sub-phases: Rogovići – Cerovlje, Cerovlje – Lupoglav and Lupoglav – Vranja, and the Rebri rest area was built separately. The construction site created about a thousand new jobs, and 90 percent of the work was performed by Croatian companies. Therefore, this project at the time of construction had an impact on GDP growth of 0.5 percent.

Further construction
The ceremonial opening of works for the construction of the second pipe of the Učka tunnel was marked on 17 December 2020, which marked the beginning of the contractual construction period of the Vranje – Učka Tunnel section of 42 months. The second pipe of the Učka tunnel includes the construction of the second lane from the Vranje junction to the Učka tunnel, i.e. the Kvarner portal, an  section on the northeast side of the motorway that includes  of the second Učka tunnel pipe with equipment and cross connections connecting the existing tunnel pipe. new rest area on the Kvarner side of the Učka tunnel. Also, the works will include the construction of a new Vranje junction, construction of a new underpass, construction of two new overpasses, construction of a traffic link above the portal of both pipes of the Učka tunnel on the Istrian side, construction of three new toll passages and construction of a new building for the fire brigade on the Istrian side. Učka tunnel. The value of the investment in sub-phase 2B2-1 is around HRK 1.5 billion. The section is quite demanding because the works zone passes through a geologically sensitive area and needs to be built under traffic.

After the completion of works on the second pipe of the Učka tunnel, the development of phase 2B2-2 remains, i.e. the section from the Učka tunnel to Matulji, as well as the construction of the Mirna and Limska draga viaducts and the stop lane on individual sections. The design of the section Matulji – Učka is in progress, after which the land purchase procedure will follow. In addition, to the road infrastructure, the expansion of the Anđeli junction is planned on this section, then the construction of 13 facilities – overpasses, underpasses, viaducts and a new rest area with a gas station at the exit from the tunnel in the direction of Rijeka. The construction will be entrusted to a local operation, in this case the one from the Primorje-Gorski Kotar County, which will enable the employment of about 500 employees. The concrete start of works on the construction of the Učka – Matulji tunnel section is planned within two years, while the construction will last approximately 36 months. Prior to the start of work, Bina-Istra needs to obtain the necessary approvals from the Grantor and close the financial structure, as well as prepare the necessary documentation to obtain a positive assessment from the European Commission.

Traffic volume

Traffic levels are regularly determined and reported by BINA Istra, operator of the motorway, and published by Hrvatske ceste. In 2010 the traffic volume was only measured in two sections: in the Učka Tunnel and between Lupoglav and Cerovlje. In 2011, traffic counting was started in each section of the A8 between Kanfanar interchange and the Učka Tunnel using the toll ticket counts. As of June 2012, only the  figures for 2011 have been published. The largest  volume was recorded in the Učka Tunnel; it represents the only high-performance link between Istria and the rest of the Croatian motorway network.

The differences between the AADT and ASDT traffic volumes in 2010 are attributed to the motorway's carriage of substantial tourist traffic to the Adriatic Sea resorts along the Istrian peninsula. On average, the A8 motorway's ASDT is at least 65% more than the AADT. The largest increase of the ASDT relative to the AADT, 68%, is observed in the Veprinac–Vranja section (which includes the Učka Tunnel). During the summer of 2007, an ASDT of 14,000 was observed in the tunnel, prompting BINA Istra to consider preparing to construct the second tunnel tube. BINA Istra expects the motorways it manages to carry more than 20,000 vehicles per day during the peak tourist season periods.

Exit list

Service areas
As of June 2012, there were two service areas along the A8 route. Croatian legislation identifies four types of service areas designated "A" through "D": Type A service areas have a full range of amenities, including a filling station, a restaurant and a hotel or motel; Type B service areas lack lodgings but are otherwise identical to Type A; Type C service areas, which are very common, include a filling station and a café (with waiters serving beverages, sandwiches, and snacks, but not full meals), but no restaurants or accommodations; and Type D service areas only offer parking spaces, restrooms, and possibly picnicking tables and benches (with an additional Type D1 also having a seasonal eating establishment). The service area filling stations frequently have small convenience stores, and some of them offer LPG fuel.

BINA Istra, the primary operator of the route, leases the type A, B, and C service areas to various operators through public tenders. As of September 2011, INA was the rest-area operator on the A8 and the A9 motorways. The service area operators are not permitted to sublease the fuel operations, but can sublease other parts of the service areas. The A8's service areas are accessible from both sides of the motorway and operate 24 hours a day, 7 days a week.

See also

 International E-road network
 Transport in Croatia

References

External links
 Camera viewing the route to the Učka Tunnel 
 Traffic reports 

Motorways in Croatia
Transport in Istria County
Transport in Primorje-Gorski Kotar County